Heed or HEED may refer to:

People
 Anneli Heed (born 1978), Swedish stand-up comedian impersonator and voice actress
 John Clifford Heed (1862–1908), American composer and musician
 Jonas Heed (born 1967), Swedish former professional ice hockey player
 Kash Heed (born 1955), Canadian former politician
 Peter Heed, American lawyer and a former New Hampshire Attorney General
 Tim Heed (born 1991), Swedish professional ice hockey player

Arts, entertainment, and media
 Heed (band), Swedish heavy metal band active 2004–2008 with Daniel Heiman and Fredrik Olsson
 Miss Heed, a character in Villainous (TV series)

Military
 USS Heed (AM-100), an Auk-class minesweeper
 Helicopter emergency egress device (HEED), an item of survival equipment in the military for crew trapped in a ditched aircraft

Places
 Heed Rock, a rock in the Wilhelm Archipelago, Antarctica